Matthew John Corbett Watson (born 4 April 1987), is an English cricketer. Watson is a right-handed batsman who bowls leg breaks. He was born in Barnet, London and educated at Dr Challoner's Grammar School in Amersham before studying at Oxford Brookes University.

Watson made his debut for Buckinghamshire County Cricket Club in the 2007 MCCA Knockout Trophy against Hertfordshire. He played Minor counties cricket for Buckinghamshire between 2007 and 2015, which included 17 Minor Counties Championship matches and 16 MCCA Knockout Trophy matches. Watson made his first-class cricket debut for Oxford UCCE against Worcestershire in 2009. He played a further five first-class fixtures spread over 2009 and 2010, the last coming against Middlesex.

Roger Watson, his uncle, played two first-class cricket matches for Lancashire.

References

External links

1987 births
Living people
People from Chipping Barnet
Cricketers from Greater London
Alumni of Oxford Brookes University
English cricketers
Buckinghamshire cricketers
Oxford MCCU cricketers